Çilesiz can refer to:

 Çilesiz, İliç
 Çilesiz, Nusaybin